Taiwan 1895 is a Chinese television series based on historical events that took place in Taiwan in the late Qing dynasty, such as the 1884–1885 Sino–French War and the Treaty of Shimonoseki. The series was directed by Han Gang and written by Yang Xiaoxiong. It was first broadcast in mainland China on CCTV in 2008.

Cast
 Li Xuejian as Li Hongzhang
 Chang Rong as Liu Yongfu
 Liu Dekai as Liu Mingchuan
 Pan Hong as Empress Dowager Cixi
 Liu Guanxiang as Guangxu Emperor
 Jing Minghua as Tang Jingsong
 Tan Tao as Li Jingfang
 Gao Dongping as Zhang Peilun
 Zhou Yemang as Weng Tonghe
 Liu Wenzhi as Zuo Zongtang
 Ji Qilin as Prince Gong
 You Li as Sun Yuwen
 Yao Gang as Ding Ruchang
 Zhu Ting as Li Ju'ou
 Li Wenwen as Liu Yingjiao
 Fang Ye as Wang Dusi
 Masser as Amédée Courbet

External links
 
  Taiwan 1895 on Sina.com

Television series set in the Qing dynasty
2008 Chinese television series debuts
China Central Television original programming
Mandarin-language television shows
Chinese historical television series